Caught in the Act is the third studio album by Australian recording artist Debbie Byrne. The album was released in April 1991 and peaked at number 2 on the ARIA Charts.

At the ARIA Music Awards of 1992, the album was nominated for ARIA Award for Best Adult Contemporary Album.

Track listing

The track "I'd Do Anything" features her two daughters Arja and Lauren.

Charts

Weekly charts

Year-end charts

Certifications

References

Debra Byrne albums
Covers albums
1991 albums
Mushroom Records albums